Azaiki Public Library is a registered non-governmental organization (NGO) based in the United States, which provides assistance to students and educational institutions. The library is suitable for reading, preparing for educational exams such as GMAT, SAT and browsing the internet.

History 
Azaiki foundation is owned by Professor Steve Azaiki, the Bayelsa State government former secretary. The idea for a public library came in 1999 and after a series of contributions from Azaiki, his family and directors of his foundation. Azaiki Public Library was established on May 19, 2015, and was commissioned by the former president of Nigeria, Goodluck Jonathan. The library modern and its quality matches US standards and requirements.

The library was opened by Mallam Shakarau who represented the then former president Jonathan, it is a four-storey building which also houses an art gallery and museum.

Also in attendance of the commissioning was Governor Henry Seriake Dickson, represented by his Chief of Staff, Talford Ongolo. Azaiki Public Library is a 5-star library with enticing environment and facilities which are of best quality intending to serve the public free of charge.

Vision 
Their activities are committed to knowledge development services creating a legacy of continuing education,  re-engineering of skills and retaining leadership position by providing up to date needing materials and a world class e-Library.

Sections and Services 

 Sections and collections
 Periodicals (current and archived; hard copy and web)
 Books and reference (inspirational books, reference books, business management, CDs, e-books, web sites)
 Database (print, CD-ROM, web)
 Directories (subscribed or in-house; print or CD-ROM or web)
 Audiovisual collection (movies)
 Library visiting hours for reading and reference
 Book loan
 Inter-library loan 
 Audio-visual facilities
 Internet access facilities
 Information research services
 Workshops
 Seminars and demos
 Photocopying

Books and References 

 Company law
 Taxation Law
 Nigerian Law review
 Local registrations
 Nigerian regulations regarding drugs, medical devices, foods, environment
 Local and regional information, service providers etc
 In-house databases and directories of service providers
 In-house databases and directories of business mentors
 In-house databases and directories of financiers
 In-house databases and directories of government funding sources and supporting mechanisms
 Technology trends and reviews
 Technology Review
 Nature
 Science
 Agriculture Books and Review
 Social Science Books & Review
 Engineering Books & Review
 Nigerian Government Contracts gazette

See also
National Library of Nigeria
Federal University of Technology Owerri Library
Ibom E-Library

References

Further reading

External links
 

Libraries established in 2015
2015 establishments in Nigeria
Public libraries in Nigeria
Libraries in Bayelsa